Bongo Maffin is a South African kwaito music group formed that was originally formed by a Zimbabwe-born musician DJ Appleseed Johannesburg in 1996. They released their first studio album, Leaders of D’Gong, in 1997, followed by  The Concerto(1998)Bongolution (2001) and New Construction (2005).The group consisted of four members namely Stone Seate, Jah Seed, Speedy and lead vocalist  Lead singer Thandiswa Mazwai published her debut solo album, Zabalaza, in 2006, after the group departed ways. However their reunion in 2019 came with a new Afro-beat Pop album From Bongo With Love, thus not deviating from their original sound.

Album awards

|-
| 1999
| The Concerto
| South African Music Awards: Best African Pop Album
| 
|-
| 2001
| Bongolution
| Kora Africa Music Awards: Best African Group
| 
|-
| 2002
| Bongolution
| Metro FM Awards: Best African Pop
| 
|-
| 2002
| Bongolution
| Metro FM Awards: Best Duo/Group
| 
|-
| 2002
| Bongolution
| South African Music Award: Best Duo/Group
| 
|-
| 2006
| New Construction
| South African Music Award: Best Duo/Group
| 
|-
| 2006
| New Construction
| Kora Africa Music Awards: Best African Group
| 
|-
| 2006
| New Construction
| BBC World Music Awards: Best African Album
| 
|}
Source:

See also
 Music of South Africa

References

External links

Bongo Maffin at Lightyear Entertainment

Kwaito musicians
Musical groups established in 1996
South African musical groups